Sergey Vasilyevich Shelpakov (born 18 September 1956) is a retired Soviet cyclist. He was part of the Soviet team that won the 100 km time trial event at the 1980 Summer Olympics.

After retiring from competitions around 1985 he worked as a sports teacher and functionary, eventually becoming Minister of Sport of Omsk Oblast (2004–2012) and then Deputy Minister of Sport of Russia (2012–2014). He specializes in popularization of sport, especially among disabled individuals.

References

1956 births
Living people
Soviet male cyclists
Olympic cyclists of the Soviet Union
Cyclists at the 1980 Summer Olympics
Olympic medalists in cycling
Olympic gold medalists for the Soviet Union
Medalists at the 1980 Summer Olympics
People from Omsk Oblast